Piotr Nowak (born 30 April 1980) is a Polish economist and politician. He was Minister of Development and Technology in the Second Cabinet of Mateusz Morawiecki until resigning in March 2022.

References 

Living people
1980 births
Economy ministers of Poland

21st-century Polish politicians
Polish economists
SGH Warsaw School of Economics alumni